Sixty Point Bold is a 1959 Australian television play which aired on ABC. It was produced by the Sydney station of the network, ABN-2, and was kinescoped/telerecorded for showing in Melbourne on ABV-2. It was the second 90-minute live television play produced by ABN.  It was written and produced by Royston Morley and aired July 16, 1959 for 90 minutes.

Plot
Set in a fictional South American country, it concerned a newspaper magnate Andre Charvet who clashes with the president of the nation, whose democratic government has replaced a dictatorship.  Charveet brings a foreign correspondent called David back to the country to campaign against the President.

Cast
Kevin Brennan as Andre Charvet
James Condon as President Ortega de Riverda
Dinah Shearing as Maria Charvet
Bruce Beeby as Paul Crevel, Maria's lover
Harp McGuire as David, a foreign correspondent
Charles Tasman
John Alden.

Production 
It was the third in a series of plays dealing with a man in political power. Advertising called it "the story of political intrigue, violence and romance in a Latin America state".

See also
List of live television plays broadcast on Australian Broadcasting Corporation (1950s)

References

External links
Sixty Point Bold on IMDb

1958 television plays
1950s Australian television plays
Australian Broadcasting Corporation original programming
English-language television shows
Black-and-white Australian television shows